Samantha Barning (born 28 June 1989) is a Dutch badminton player. She can play either in singles or in doubles. She won bronze medals at the 2014 European Championships in the mixed doubles with Jorrit de Ruiter, and at the 2016 European Championships in the women's doubles with Iris Tabeling. Barning also featured in the Dutch women's team that won bronze at the 2012 European Women's Team Championships.

Achievements

European Championships 
Women's doubles

Mixed doubles

BWF Grand Prix 
The BWF Grand Prix had two levels, the Grand Prix and Grand Prix Gold. It was a series of badminton tournaments sanctioned by the Badminton World Federation (BWF) and played between 2007 and 2017.

Women's doubles

Mixed doubles

 BWF Grand Prix Gold tournament
 BWF Grand Prix tournament

BWF International Challenge/Series 
Women's doubles

Mixed doubles

  BWF International Challenge tournament
  BWF International Series tournament

References

External links 
 FZ Forza Profile

1989 births
Living people
Sportspeople from Amstelveen
Dutch female badminton players
21st-century Dutch women